Teri Clark Linden is an American actress, best known for her film roles in Super 8, Jack Reacher and Love & Other Drugs.

Early life and education 
Clark Linden was born in Dayton, Ohio. She earned a Bachelor of Arts degree in theater from Roosevelt University.

Career 
From 2003 to 2004, Clark Linden appeared in five plays at actor Jeff Daniels's Purple Rose Theatre in Chelsea, Michigan, including the world premiere of Tim Clue's Leaving Iowa and Mitch Albom's Duck Hunter Shoots Angel.  In 2007, she co-starred on stage with Laverne & Shirleys Cindy Williams and Eddie Mekka in the comedy Kong's Night Out.  Clark Linden has narrated over 100 audiobooks for Audible.com and Brilliance Audio, mainly recorded from her home studio.

Personal life 
She has been married to David Linden since 2002; they have one son together.

Filmography

Film

Television

References

External links

Living people
Actresses from Dayton, Ohio
Roosevelt University alumni
American film actresses
American stage actresses
21st-century American actresses

Year of birth missing (living people)